The Don River Railway is a volunteer-run vintage railway and museum in Don, a suburb of Devonport, Tasmania. It runs a passenger train ride from Don to Coles Beach (operationally known as Don Junction) and return.  The current line follows a reconstructed section of the former Melrose line that ran between Don Junction and Paloona. 

The Don River Railway is open from Saturday to Thursday, closing only for Christmas Day, Good Friday, and ANZAC Day. On weekdays customers can expect to ride in a 1940s ex Tasmanian Government Railways rail car and trailer, DP22 and PT3. On weekend operations a heritage carriage set is hauled by either a steam locomotive or a vintage diesel locomotive.

Steam Locomotives
Tasmanian Government Railways' pacific class M4 serves as Don River Railway's primary operational steam locomotive.  CCS 25 has recently been reactivated as to January 2023, but awaits approval to return to revenue operations.  Fowler no.5268 is currently non-operational following expiry of its boiler ticket; with plans for reactivation following CCS 25's return to operations.
Future plans also include overhaul of M4 including potential for refurbishment or replacement of its boiler, or the potential to return MA2 or No.8 Heemskirk to service.

Diesel Locomotives

References 
 The Don River Railway home page

 Cooper, Greg (ca.2002) The History of the Don River Railway's Locomotives, Railcars  & Carriages, published by the Don River Railway, 
 McKillop, Robert (2010) Australian Railway Heritage Guide, 2010 Edition, Australian Railway Historical Society (New South Wales Division),

External links

Rail transport in Tasmania
Heritage railways in Australia
Tourist attractions in Tasmania
Railway museums in Tasmania
3 ft 6 in gauge railways in Australia
Devonport, Tasmania
Tourist railways in Tasmania